The Labasa Mill Tramway is a  narrow gauge railway with a gauge of  in the northeast of Vanua Levu, the second largest island of Fiji.

Operation
The railway is operated from 1894 to today for the transportation of cane from the farms to the Labasa Mill for crushing..

Locomotives
In 1957 the following locomotives were used:

References

2 ft gauge railways in Fiji
Fiji